Al Ghasham Al-Malajm is a sub-district located in the Al Malagim District, Al Bayda Governorate, Yemen. Al Ghasham Al-Malajm had a population of 5734 according to the 2004 census.

References 

Sub-districts in Al Malagim District